Kadhal Virus is a 2002 Indian Tamil-language romance film written, directed and produced by Kathir. The film featured Richard Rishi, Ajith's brother-in-law, and Sridevi Vijaykumar, Vijayakumar's daughter, making their acting debuts in the film, with Abbas in a supporting role. A. R. Rahman composed the music for the film, while Arjun Jena was the cinematographer for the project. The film tells the story of a young director, trying to pursue his dream by overcoming all hurdles. After much delay, the film opened in December 2002. Unlike his previous two films Kadhal Desam (1996) and Kadhalar Dhinam (1999), Kathir's Kadhal Virus was panned by critics and fared poorly at the box office.

Plot
Deepak is a budding filmmaker trying to get his first production out. He gets a chance to go to Coonoor to write a script for a movie where he meets and falls in love with Geetha. After a struggle, Geeta understands his love and convinces her father. The couple decide to get married once his first film is made. Deepak leaves for Chennai, promising to write letters to Geeta. However the postman who is secretly in love with Geeta hides all the letters sent by Deepak, including the later changing his address. A chasm develops between the lovers because of the communication issue caused by the postman.

Geeta convinces her father to search for Deepak and finds him successfully in a movie set. However she and her father misunderstand Deepak shouting at his assistants to be words meant for them and they leave. Deepak is heartbroken when he learns of Geeta's visit, however she is lost for ever in his life. Years go past, and now Deepak is a highly successful film director. He is in search of new faces for his upcoming movie. He comes across Rajiv, who is a poor aspiring actor. It however turns out that Rajiv is from a wealthy family, but has chosen a hard life because of his passion to be a movie star. Deepak knows of the hardships of the cine field and advises Rajiv to go back to his family giving up his dream, because Deepak feels Rajiv can lead a better life with his family. This leads to Rajiv getting rejected by other movie directors as well. Deepak does this to help Rajiv lead a good life rather than him struggling and wasting his time. Rajiv however consumes poison and attempts suicide.

Fate leads to Deepak overhearing a conversation between Geeta and her friend in a poor slum. Deepak is initially elated to see Geeta, however he is pained that she lives in such a filthy place. It turns out that Rajiv had married Geeta. She fully supports Rajiv in realizing his dream, but is repulsed to learn Deepak still has feelings for her and as a result rejected Rajiv and refuses him to have a career in cine industry. This is a complete misunderstanding on her part. Deepak decides to set things right. He invites Rajiv to his studio and promises he'll be the hero of his movie, under one condition that Rajiv must not tell Geeta that he is playing the protagonist in Deepak's movie. Rajiv is elated, and promises to keep this a secret.

Deepak alters his story to suit Rajiv. Due to the tweaks, the actor originally roped in to play the hero of the movie has to be chucked out of his role. The actor pleads with Deepak not to do it as it would ruin his reputation and dream. Deepak however does not budge and goes ahead with his plan to cast Rajiv. This causes friction between the movie producer and Deepak, leading to the producer dumping him. Deepak, out of his love for Geeta, decides to produce the movie himself, taking loans from creditors. The young actor whom Deepak chucked out of his movie vents out his anger by stabbing Deepak on the movie set. Deepak is admitted to a hospital and his health deteriorates. The creditors demand their money back and Deepak settles the debt with his own money. He continues directing the movie under severe financial and physical strain. He is determined to complete the movie and goes penniless as a result. The movie is completed and released. Deepak watches the movie in a theater sitting with commoners. He is completely broke and a pauper, but filled with happiness as he has made his lover's wish of making her husband a hero come true.

Rajiv reveals to Geeta about the movie. Geeta is upset when she finds out Deepak is the director, but realizes the hardships Deepak had to undergo. By chance she runs into the postman who reveals that it was him rather than Deepak who ruined her life. Geeta goes in search of Deepak, finally meets him in the theater only to find him dead with a smile on his face.

Cast

 Richard as Deepak
 Sridevi Vijaykumar as Geetha
 Vivek as Puthir
 Abbas as Rajiv 
 Raghuvaran as Raghu
 Manorama as Aavudai Aachi
 Pyramid Natarajan as Film producer
 Laxmi Rattan as Geetha's father
 Jaya Murali as Geetha's mother
 Ragasudha as Geetha's friend
 Arvind Kathare as Deepak's friend and Geetha's cousin
 Ramesh Maali as Deepak's friend
 Deepak Dinkar as Deepak's friend
 Vasudevan Baskaran as Sudhakaran
 Srinath as Postman
 Cell Murugan as Police inspector
 Lekhasri as Woman at the bus stand
 Vellai Subbaiah as Protester
 Theni Kunjarammal as Old woman
 Sakthivel as Theatre owner
 T. G. Thyagarajan as himself (Cameo appearance)
 Kathir as himself (Cameo appearance)
 Mysskin as Kathir's assistant (uncredited role)
 Vetrimaaran as Deepak's assistant (uncredited role)

A sequence in the film stars guest appearances from:

 A. R. Rahman
 Bharathiraja
 Chitra Lakshmanan
 G. M. Kumar
 K. Balachander
 K. S. Ravikumar
 Keyaar
 Mani Ratnam
 Manjula Vijayakumar
 Mansoor Ali Khan
 Nassar
 Nikkil Murugan
 P. Vasu
 Parthiban
 Prashanth
 Raj Kapoor
 Rajkiran
 Ramesh Khanna
 Saran
 Shankar
 Silambarasan
 T. Rajender
 Thalaivasal Vijay
 Vaali
 Vijayakanth
 Vijayakumar
 Vikraman

Production
Through the 1990s, Kathir developed a reputation of producing successful romantic films with critically acclaimed soundtracks by A. R. Rahman and his works in Kadhal Desam (1996) and Kadhalar Dhinam (1999) won commercial and critical acclaim.

In March 2002, Kathir announced that his next film would also be a love story titled Kadhal Virus. Chennai-based model Srikanth was cast in the lead role and was coached acting skills by then-assistant directors such as Vetrimaaran and Mysskin. Srikanth was later dropped and actor Richard, the brother of actresses Shalini and Shamili, was selected to make his debut in the leading role. Abbas, who Kathir introduced with Kadhal Desam, was also signed on to make a special appearance in the film.

Early reports suggested that Bhumika Chawla would star in the film but she later opted out. Her role was later handed to Sridevi Vijaykumar, the youngest daughter of veteran actor couple Vijayakumar and Manjula, who would make her Tamil debut as a leading heroine with the film. The team decided to film a sequence with several prominent directors as a part of the film's launch event.

Release
The satellite rights of the film were sold to Jaya TV. Malathi Rangarajan of The Hindu mentioned that "the screenplay is incoherent in parts" and that "the dialogue and expressions are sometimes too clichéd". The critic blamed the film's production delay revealing that "initially the film did kindle a lot of interest — what with A. R. Rahman as composer and a fresh lead pair to boot, but because it has been in the making for too long, the euphoria first triggered did wane a little". Another critic from AllIndianSite.com mentioned that "Richard looks good and also performs well while Sridevi acts with ease and looks beautiful".

The film became a box office failure and despite a high-profile launch, actor Richard has since struggled to get a meaningful breakthrough. The director of the film, Kathir, also went into a hiatus and has yet to make a film since the failure of Kadhal Virus. Debutant cinematographer Arjun Jena won the Tamil Nadu State Film Award for Best Cinematographer for his work in the film. Lyricist Vaali received great appreciation.

Soundtrack

The soundtrack consists of 6 songs composed by A.R. Rahman with lyrics penned by Vaali and Pa. Vijay.

References

External links
 

2002 films
2000s Tamil-language films
Films scored by A. R. Rahman
2002 romantic drama films
Indian romantic drama films
Films shot in Ooty
Films shot in Chennai
Films about film directors and producers
Films about actors
Films directed by Kathir